Sabayad, also known as kimis, is a type of flatbread eaten in  Somalia and Djibouti. It is closely related to the paratha of the Indian subcontinent.

History
A very commonly served bread in Somali cuisine, sabayad is usually eaten during breakfast or dinner. It is made from a dough of plain flour, water and salt. Like the paratha, it is rolled into rough squares or circles and then briefly fried in a pan. However, the sabayad is mainly prepared in the traditional Somali way.

References

External links
Sabayaad - Flatbread

Unleavened breads
Flatbreads
Djiboutian cuisine
Somali cuisine